Paul Felix Piechowski (30 June 1892 – 9 June 1966) was a Lutheran theologian and physician.

Biography 
Piechowski was born in Turoscheln, East Prussia (modern Turośl, Poland), he studied Lutheran theology and Philosophy at the University of Königsberg. In 1916 he worked as a Pastor in Königsberg and from 1917 to 1919 as a military chaplain. In 1919 he joined the "religious-socialist movement" and started to work as a Pastor in Berlin-Neukölln until 1928, from 1928 until 1934 in Berlin-Britz.
In 1924 he became the Chairman of the Union of Socialist theologians. Piechowski started to study medicine in 1932, was dismissed from his position as a Pastor in 1934 and worked as a physician. After World War II he practised in Babelsberg and became a medical director at the German Central Administration of the Soviet occupation zone. From 1946 to 1953 Piechowski was a member of the medical branch of the municipal administration of Berlin. Until 1961 he practised as a physician in Berlin-Moabit.

Piechowski was a member of the Social Democratic Party of Germany and died in Bad Godesberg.

References 

1892 births
1966 deaths
People from East Prussia
University of Königsberg alumni
Humboldt University of Berlin alumni
20th-century German Lutheran clergy
German Army personnel of World War I
German military chaplains
People from Pisz County